Shaffer Union Elementary School District is a public school district in Lassen County, California, United States.

References

External links
   

School districts in California